is a Japanese football player currently playing for FC Maruyasu Okazaki.

Club statistics
Updated to 1 January 2020.

References

External links
Profile at Yokohama FC

1986 births
Living people
Association football people from Gifu Prefecture
Japanese footballers
J1 League players
J2 League players
J3 League players
Japan Football League players
Nagoya Grampus players
Tokushima Vortis players
Yokohama FC players
AC Nagano Parceiro players
FC Maruyasu Okazaki players
Association football forwards